Patrícia Cocco (born ) is a retired Brazilian female volleyball player. She was part of the Brazil women's national volleyball team.

She participated in the 1994 FIVB Volleyball World Grand Prix.

On club level she played with Colgate/Sao Caetano in 1994.
Melhor tia do mundo

Clubs
 Colgate/Sao Caetano (1994)

References

External links
 
http://www.fivb.org/en/volleyball/Competitions/WorldClubChampionships/2011/Women/Teams.asp?Team=SOO

1971 births
Living people
People from São Caetano do Sul
Brazilian women's volleyball players
Sportspeople from São Paulo (state)
20th-century Brazilian women